Gmina Białopole is a rural gmina (administrative district) in Chełm County, Lublin Voivodeship, in eastern Poland.

The gmina contains part of the protected area called Strzelce Landscape Park.

Villages
Gmina Białopole contains the villages and settlements of Białopole, Busieniec, Buśno, Grobelki, Horeszkowice, Kicin, Kurmanów, Maziarnia Strzelecka, Raciborowice, Raciborowice-Kolonia, Strzelce, Strzelce-Kolonia, Teremiec, Teresin and Zabudnowo.

Neighbouring gminas
Gmina Białopole is bordered by the gminas of Dubienka, Horodło, Hrubieszów, Uchanie, Wojsławice and Żmudź.

References

External links
Polish official population figures 2006

Bialopole
Chełm County